The Slovenian Republic League 1990–91 was the last season of Slovenian top-league within the Yugoslav football system. The first fourteen clubs secured their place in a newly established Slovenian First League.

Final table

Promoted

External links
Football Association of Slovenia 

1990–91 in Slovenian football
4
Slovenia
Slovenian Republic Football League seasons